This is a list of towns in Australia by state.

Australian Capital Territory

 Hall
 Canberra
 Tharwa

New South Wales

 the Geographical Names Register (GNR) of NSW, which is maintained by the Geographical Names Board of New South Wales, lists 265 places that are assigned or recorded as towns in New South Wales.

 Aberdare
 Abermain
 Adaminaby
 Adelong
 Agnes Banks
 Anna Bay
 Ardlethan
 Ariah Park
 Ashford
 Austinmer
 Avoca Beach
 Ballina
 Balranald
 Bangalow
 Baradine
 Bargo
 Barham
 Barraba
 Batemans Bay
 Batlow
 Bega
 Bellbird
 Bellingen
 Berkeley Vale
 Bermagui
 Berridale
 Berrigan
 Berrima
 Berry
 Bilpin
 Binalong
 Bingara
 Binnaway
 Blackheath
 Blaxland
 Blayney
 Boggabilla
 Boggabri
 Bolwarra
 Bomaderry
 Bombala
 Bonalbo
 Bonnells Bay
 Bowenfels
 Bowraville
 Braidwood
 Branxton
 Brewarrina
 Brooklyn
 Brunswick Heads
 Bulahdelah
 Bullaburra
 Bulli
 Bundarra
 Bungendore
 Buronga
 Burradoo
 Canowindra
 Captains Flat
 Clarence Town
 Cobar
 Coledale
 Collarenebri
 Condobolin
 Coolamon
 Cooma
 Coonabarabran
 Coonamble
 Cooranbong
 Cootamundra
 Corowa
 Cowra
 Crescent Head
 Crookwell
 Cudal
 Cumnock
 Dapto
 Dareton
 Deepwater
 Delegate
 Delungra
 Deniliquin
 Denman
 Dorrigo
 Dunedoo
 Dungog
 Edgeworth
 Ellalong
 Emu Plains
 Eugowra
 Euston
 Evans Head
 Faulconbridge
 Fingal Head
 Forbes
 Forster
 Frederickton
 Galong
 Ganmain
 Gerringong
 Geurie
 Gilgandra
 Gillieston Heights
 Gladstone
 Glen Innes
 Glenbrook
 Gol Gol
 Gorokan
 Greenhill
 Greenwell Point
 Grenfell
 Greta
 Grose Vale
 Gulargambone
 Gundagai
 Gunnedah
 Gunning
 Guyra
 Harden
 Hawks Nest
 Hay
 Hazelbrook
 Heddon Greta
 Helensburgh
 Henty
 Hexham
 Hillston
 Holbrook
 Huskisson
 Inverell
 Ivanhoe
 Jennings
 Jerilderie
 Jindabyne
 Jugiong
 Junee
 Kandos
 Katoomba
 Kearsley
 Kempsey
 Kimovale
 Kinchela
 Kurrajong
 Kurri Kurri
 Kyogle
 Lake Cargelligo
 Lake Illawarra
 Lapstone
 Lawson
 Leura
 Lightning Ridge
 Macksville
 Mallanganee
 Manildra
 Manilla
 Marulan
 Mathoura
 Medlow Bath
 Mendooran
 Menindee
 Merimbula
 Millfield
 Milton
 Moama
 Molong
 Moree
 Moulamein
 Mount Riverview
 Mount Victoria
 Mudgee
 Murrumburrah
 Murwillumbah
 Muswellbrook
 Nabiac
 Nambucca Heads
 Narooma
 Narrandera
 Narromine
 Neath
 Nelson Bay
 Nimmitabel
 Noraville
 North Richmond
 Nowra
 Numbaa
 Nundle
 Nyngan
 Old Junee
 Ourimbah
 Oxley Vale
 Pallamallawa
 Pambula
 Parkes
 Paterson
 Paxton
 Peak Hill
 Picton
 Port Kembla
 Port Macquarie
 Raleigh
 Raymond Terrace
 Rylstone
 Scarborough
 Smithtown
 South Gundagai
 South West Rocks
 Springwood
 Stanwell Park
 Stuart Town
 Sussex Inlet
 Talbingo
 Tarcutta
 Taree
 Tea Gardens
 Tenterfield
 Terrigal
 The Oaks
 The Rock
 Thirlmere
 Thirroul
 Thurgoona
 Tingha
 Tomerong
 Tottenham
 Toukley
 Trangie
 Trundle
 Tullamore
 Tumbarumba
 Tumut
 Tuncurry
 Tuntable Creek
 Tweed Heads
 Ulladulla
 Ungarie
 Uralla
 Urana
 Uranquinty
 Urbenville
 Urunga
 Valley Heights
 Walcha
 Walgett
 Warialda
 Warrell Creek
 Warren
 Warrimoo
 Waterfall
 Wellington
 Wentworth
 Wentworth Falls
 West Wallsend
 West Wyalong
 Weston
 Wilcannia
 Wingham
 Wombarra
 Woodburn
 Woodenbong
 Woodford
 Woodstock
 Wyalong
 Yass
 Yeoval
 Young

Northern Territory

 Adelaide River
 Ali Curung
 Alice Springs
 Alpurrurulam
 Alyangula
 Amoonguna
 Angurugu
 Aputula
 Areyonga
 Atitjere
 Barrow Creek
 Barunga
 Batchelor
 Birdum
 Borroloola
 Bulman
 Daly River
 Daly Waters
 Elliott
 Fleming
 Gunbalanya
 Haasts Bluff
 Harts Range
 Hermannsburg
 Humpty Doo
 Imanpa
 Jabiru
 Kalkarindji
 Kaltukatjara
 Katherine
 Kintore
 Kulgera
 Lajamanu
 Larrimah
 Maningrida
 Mataranka
 Milikapiti
 Minjilang
 Mutitjulu
 Newcastle Waters
 Nganmarriyanga
 Ngukurr
 Nhulunbuy
 Numbulwar
 Nyirripi
 Maningrida
 Papunya
 Peppimenarti
 Pine Creek
 Tennant Creek
 Ti-Tree
 Timber Creek
 Wadeye
 Warruwi
 Wurrumiyanga
 Yarralin
 Yirrkala
 Yuendumu
 Yulara

Queensland

 Adavale
 Allora
 Aramac
 Atherton
 Augathella
 Ayr
 Banana
 Barcaldine
 Beaudesert
 Bedourie
 Biloela
 Birdsville
 Blackall
 Blackbutt
 Blackwater
 Bogantungan
 Boonah
 Bouldercombe
 Boulia
 Bowen
 Bray Park
 Calliope
 Cambooya
 Camooweal
 Capella
 Cardwell
 Cashmere
 Charleville
 Childers
 Chillagoe
 Chinchilla
 Clermont
 Clifton
 Cloncurry
 Coen
 Collinsville
 Cooktown
 Cooroy
 Crows Nest
 Cunnamulla
 Dysart, Queensland
 Dalby
 Dirranbandi
 Duaringa
 Eidsvold
 Emerald
 Emu Park
 Esk
 Gatton
 Gayndah
 Georgetown
 Goombungee
 Goondiwindi
 Gordonvale
 Gracemere
 Grantham
 Greenvale
 Hebel
 Herberton
 Highfields
 Hughenden
 Ingham
 Inglewood
 Injune
 Innisfail
 Isisford
 Jimboomba
 Kilcoy
 Kilkivan
 Kingaroy
 Laidley
 Longreach
 Maleny
 Mareeba
 Marlborough
 Miles
 Mitchell
 Monto
 Mount Morgan
 Mount Samson 
 Moura
 Mundubbera
 Murgon
 Muttaburra
 Nambour
 Nobby
 Normanton
 Oakey
 Proserpine
 Quilpie
 Rathdowney
 Richmond
 Rolleston
 Roma
 Rosewood
 St George
 Samford
 Samsonvale
 Sapphire
 Sarina
 Springsure
 Stanthorpe
 Strathpine
 Surat
 Tambo
 Taroom
 Texas
 Tolga
 Toowoomba
 Thargomindah
 Theodore
 Tully
 Wallangarra
 Warwick
 Warner
 Weipa
 Westwood
 Windorah
 Winton
 Yeppoon
 Yungaburra

South Australia

Tasmania

Victoria

Western Australia

See also 
 List of towns and cities in Australia by year of settlement

References 

 
Towns